This is a list of mayors of Clermont-Ferrand. It includes all mayors (maires) of Clermont-Ferrand, France, since 1694.

Ancien Régime
1694-1719 : Jean-Antoine de Bonnet
1720-1723 : Antoine de Bonnet (his son)
1723-1724 : N... Bernard
1751 : Annet Barthomyvat des Paleines
1766-1769 : Jean-Baptiste Guerrier
1769-1772 : Annet Barthomyvat des Paleines
1777-1780 : Pierre Tixier
1780-1786 : Guillaume du Fraisse de Vernines
1786-1790 : Louis Anne Reboul
1790-1791 : Jean-François Gaultier de Biauzat
1791-1792 : Antoine Sablon

Republic
1792-1794 : Michel Monestier
1794-1794 : Étienne Bonarme (3 months)
1794-1795 : Jean-François Gaultier de Biauzat
1795-1795 : Antoine Bergier (4 months)
1795-1797 : Michel Monestier
1797-1798 : Guillaume Grimardias
1798-1798 : Claude Alexis Mabru (5 months)
1798-1800 : Jacques Veysset
1800-1805 : Antoine Sablon
1805-1809 : Martial de Solagniat, juge
1809-1815 : François Grangier de Lamothe
1815-1818 : Jean-Baptiste André, baron d'Aubière
1818-1820 : Jean-Baptiste Joseph Tixier, baron
1820-1822 : Jean-Baptiste André, baron d'Aubière
1822-1830 : Antoine Blatin
1830-1835 : Jules Gilbert Antoine Cariol
1835-1843 : Hippolyte Conchon
1843-1848 : Lunius Verdier de Latour
1848-1848 : Antoine Jouvet (3 months)
1848-1848 : Jean-Joseph Vimal-Lalarrige (4 months)
1848-1850 : Jean-Baptiste Poncillon
1850-1860 : Pierre Léon Bérard de Chazelles
1860-1861 : Frédéric Claude François Bonnay
1862-1870 : Jacques Philippe Mège
1870-1871 : Agénor Bardoux (maternal grandfather of Valéry Giscard d'Estaing)
1871-1874 : Agis-Léon Ledru
1874-1875 : Félix Rougane de Chanteloup
1875-1880 : André Moinier
1880-1884 : Gilbert Gaillard
1884-1885 : Jean-Baptiste Antoine Blatin
1886-1888 : Émile Saint-Rame
1888-1893 : Louis Arnédée Ulysse Gasquet

Elected mayors
The mayors of Clermont-Ferrand from 1893 to present.

See also
 Timeline of Clermont-Ferrand

Clermont-Ferrand